Jack William Dykinga (born January 2, 1943) is an American photographer. For 1970 work with the Chicago Sun-Times he won the annual Pulitzer Prize for Feature Photography citing "dramatic and sensitive photographs at the Lincoln and Dixon State Schools for the Retarded in Illinois."

Career
Born in Chicago, Dykinga began his career at the Chicago Tribune, and the Chicago Sun-Times before moving to Arizona, where he joined the Arizona Daily Star and taught at the University of Arizona and Pima Community College.

Dykinga left the Arizona Daily Star and photojournalism in 1985. Thanks to the support and inspiration of a friend, he started to work on a book about the Sonoran Desert. The publication of The Sonoran Desert launched his new career as a nature and conservation photographer.

Dykinga is a founding Fellow of the International League of Conservation Photographers. His work appears in Arizona Highways and National Geographic.
He shows at the G2 Gallery.
He is on the board of the Sonoran Desert National Park Project.

In 2010, Dykinga was photographer in residence at Sedona Photofest.

Personal
Dykinga lives in Tucson, Arizona, with his wife Margaret Malley; they married in 1965.

He attended Riverside Brookfield High School.

Awards and honors
 2010: "Stone Canyon" was selected as one of "40 Best Nature Photographs of all time" by the International League of Conservation Photographers
 2011: Outstanding Nature Photographer of the Year Award from the North American Nature Photography Association.
 2017: Lifetime Achievement Award from the North American Nature Photography Association.

Works
 Frog Mountain Blues, University of Arizona Press, 1987, 
 The Sonoran Desert H.N. Abrams, 1992, 
 The Secret Forest, University of New Mexico Press, 1993, 
 Stone Canyons of the Colorado Plateau Abrams, 1996, 
 The Sierra Pinacate University of Arizona Press, 1998, 
 Desert: The Mojave and Death Valley, Harry N. Abrams, 1999, 
 Large format nature photography, Amphoto Books, 2001, 
 Jack Dykinga's Arizona, Westcliffe Publishers, 2004, 
 Images: Jack Dykinga's Grand Canyon, Arizona Highways, 2008, 
 Capture the Magic: Train Your Eye, Improve Your Photographic Composition, Rocky Nook Publishers, 2013, 
 A Photographer's Life, Rocky Nook Publishers, 2017,

Gallery

References

External links
 
"Interview transcript", Lew and Gail Steiger, Images of Arizona
"Jack Dykinga: From Pulitzer to Pop-Up", Gordon White, Truck Camper Magazine May 19, 2009
 

American photojournalists
1943 births
Living people
Pulitzer Prize for Feature Photography winners
Photographers from Arizona
Photographers from Illinois
Artists from Chicago
Chicago Sun-Times people
20th-century American photographers
21st-century American photographers